Lamb to the Slaughter may refer to:
 "Like sheep to the slaughter", a biblical phrase promoting the myth that Jews went passively to their deaths during the Holocaust
"Lamb to the Slaughter", a 1953 short story by Roald Dahl
"Lambs to the Slaughter", a song by Raven from their 1981 album Rock Until You Drop
A Lamb to the Slaughter: An Artist Among the Battlefields, a 1984 book by Jan Montyn and Dirk Ayelt Kooiman, 		
"Lamb to the Slaughter", a song by a-ha from their 1993 album Memorial Beach
Lambs to the Slaughter, a 1979 memoir by Australian cricketer Graham Yallop